Al-Kharijiya (Arabic: الخارجية) is the largest village in Sitra, Bahrain, located near the eastern coast of the island.

References

Sitra
Populated places in Bahrain